Frosty Drew Observatory  is an educational astronomical observatory owned and operated by the Frosty Drew Memorial Fund. It is located in the Ninigret National Wildlife Refuge in Charlestown, Rhode Island midway along the coast line between Westerly and Point Judith. It is named after Edwin "Frosty" Drew. The main instrument is a PlaneWave CDK600 24" Corrected Dall-Kirkham telescope which was installed in October, 2021. The current Director of the observatory and nature center is Scott MacNeill.

References

External links

Astronomical observatories in Rhode Island
Buildings and structures in Charlestown, Rhode Island
Education in Washington County, Rhode Island